The Cardwell–Holman House is a house located in northwest Portland, Oregon listed on the National Register of Historic Places.

It was designed as an early Tudor-style residence with Arts and Crafts features by Portland architect Eric W. Hendricks in 1905.

See also
 National Register of Historic Places listings in Northwest Portland, Oregon

References

1905 establishments in Oregon
Bungalow architecture in Oregon
Hillside, Portland, Oregon
Houses completed in 1905
Houses on the National Register of Historic Places in Portland, Oregon
Tudor Revival architecture in Oregon